Steve Larson (also known as Larson and Stevie J) is the former lead guitarist for Lime Green, Dead Hot Workshop (1987–1997), Dialectrics, and Roger Clyne and the Peacemakers (1999–2009).

Larson has opened for many artists solo and with the Steve Larson Band, including Shooter Jennings, Hank III, Cross Canadian Ragweed, Reckless Kelly, Billy Joe Shaver, Dick Dale, JR Brown, Stoney LaRue, Sammy Hagar, John Fogerty, Kid Rock, and Hans Olson.

Steve Larson Band
Larson now plays in his own band, which is based in Phoenix, AZ. The band, Steve Larson Band, was first established in 2005.

Discography

 Limited Edition Live
 Road Trip Songs

External links
 Steve Larson Band
 Steve Larson Recordings
 Dead Hot Workshop

Living people
Musicians from Phoenix, Arizona
Year of birth missing (living people)